Atrial natriuretic peptide (ANP) or atrial natriuretic factor (ANF) is a natriuretic peptide hormone secreted from the cardiac atria that in humans is encoded by the NPPA gene. Natriuretic peptides (ANP, BNP, and CNP) are a family of hormone/paracrine factors that are structurally related. The main function of ANP is causing a reduction in expanded extracellular fluid (ECF) volume by increasing renal sodium excretion. ANP is synthesized and secreted by cardiac muscle cells in the walls of the atria in the heart. These cells contain volume receptors which respond to increased stretching of the atrial wall due to increased atrial blood volume.

Reduction of blood volume by ANP can result in secondary effects such as reduction of extracellular fluid (ECF) volume, improved cardiac ejection fraction with resultant improved organ perfusion, decreased blood pressure, and increased serum potassium. These effects may be blunted or negated by various counter-regulatory mechanisms operating concurrently on each of these secondary effects.

Brain natriuretic peptide (BNP) – a misnomer; it is secreted by cardiac muscle cells in the heart ventricles – is similar to ANP in its effect. It acts via the same receptors as ANP does, but with 10-fold lower affinity than ANP. The biological half-life of BNP, however, is twice as long as that of ANP, and that of NT-proBNP is even longer, making these peptides better choices than ANP for diagnostic blood testing.

Clinical significance 

A member of the natriuretic peptide gene family, NPPA encodes an important cardiac signaling molecule known as atrial natriuretic peptide/factor (ANP). ANP carries out endocrine functions of the heart. It acts as a diuretic by inhibiting sodium reabsorption in the kidneys. ANP also acts in the heart to prevent cardiac hypertrophy and to regulate vascular remodeling and energy metabolism. NPPA expression is varied throughout mammalian development into adulthood. Fetal expression of NPPA is associated with the formation of chamber myocardium, muscle cells of the atria and ventricles in the early developing heart. Early expression of this gene has been associated with ventricular hypertrophy in both in vitro and in vivo models. NPPA variants affect plasma ANP concentrations, blood pressure levels, and cardiovascular diseases such as atrial fibrillation (AF). ANP-deficient mice were found to have a large increase in heart and left ventricular weight in response to volume overload, which is normally prevented by proper regulation of blood pressure. Using a knock-in (KI) rat model, researchers found an AF-associated human variant in NPPA caused inflammation, fibroblast activation, atrial fibrosis, and AF in KI rats. These findings suggest NPPA is a critical gene in cardiac development and dysfunction of this gene can lead to heart problems via altered ANP levels.

Discovery 
The discovery of a natriuretic factor (one that promotes kidney excretion of salt and water) was first reported by Adolfo José de Bold in 1981 when rat atrial extracts were found to contain a substance that increased salt and urine output in the kidney. Later, the substance was purified from heart tissue by several groups and named atrial natriuretic factor (ANF) or ANP.

Structure 
ANP is a 28-amino acid peptide with a 17-amino acid ring in the middle of the molecule. The ring is formed by a disulfide bond between two cysteine residues at positions 7 and 23. ANP is closely related to BNP (brain natriuretic peptide) and CNP (C-type natriuretic peptide), which all share a similar amino acid ring structure. ANP is one of a family of nine structurally similar natriuretic hormones: seven are atrial in origin.

Production 
ANP is synthesized as an inactive preprohormone, encoded by the human NPPA gene located on the short arm of chromosome 1. The NPPA gene is expressed primarily in atrial myocytes and consists of 2 introns and three exons, with translation of this gene yielding a high molecular mass 151 amino acid polypeptide known as preproANP. The preprohormone is activated via post-translational modification that involves cleavage of the 25 amino acid signal sequence to produce proANP, a 126 amino acid peptide that is the major form of ANP stored in intracellular granules of the atria. Following stimulation of atrial cells, proANP is released and rapidly converted to the 28-amino-acid C-terminal mature ANP on the cell surface by the cardiac transmembrane serine protease corin. Recently, it was discovered that ANP also can be O-glycosylated.

ANP is secreted in response to:
 Stretching of the atrial wall, via Atrial volume receptors
 Increased Sympathetic stimulation of β-adrenoceptors
 Increased sodium concentration (hypernatremia), though sodium concentration is not the direct stimulus for increased ANP secretion
 Endothelin, a potent vasoconstrictor

Receptors 
Three types of atrial natriuretic peptide receptors have been identified on which natriuretic peptides act. They are all cell surface receptors and designated:

 guanylyl cyclase-A (GC-A) also known as natriuretic peptide receptor-A (NPRA/ANPA) or NPR1
 guanylyl cyclase-B (GC-B) also known as natriuretic peptide receptor-B (NPRB/ANPB) or NPR2
 natriuretic peptide clearance receptor (NPRC/ANPC) or NPR3

NPR-A and NPR-B have a single membrane-spanning segment with an extracellular domain that binds the ligand. The intracellular domain maintains two consensus catalytic domains for guanylyl cyclase activity. Binding of a natriuretic peptide induces a conformational change in the receptor that causes receptor dimerization and activation.

The binding of ANP to its receptor causes the conversion of GTP to cGMP and raises intracellular cGMP. As a consequence, cGMP activates a cGMP-dependent kinase (PKG or cGK) that phosphorylates proteins at specific serine and threonine residues. In the medullary collecting duct, the cGMP generated in response to ANP may act not only through PKG but also via direct modulation of ion channels.

NPR-C functions mainly as a clearance receptor by binding and sequestering ANP from the circulation. All natriuretic peptides are bound by the NPR-C.

Physiological effects 
Maintenance of the ECF volume (space), and its subcompartment the vascular space, is crucial for survival. These compartments are maintained within a narrow range, despite wide variations in dietary sodium intake. There are three volume regulating systems: two salt saving systems, the renin angiotensin aldosterone system (RAAS) and the renal sympathetic system (RSS); and the salt excreting natriuretic peptide (NP) hormone system. When the vascular space contracts, the RAAS and RSS are "turned on"; when the atria expand, NP's are "turned on". Each system also suppresses its counteracting system(s). NP's are made in cardiac, intestinal, renal, and adrenal tissue: ANP in one of a family of cardiac NP's: others at BNP, CNP, and DNP.

ANP binds to a specific set of receptors – ANP receptors. Receptor-agonist binding causes the increase in renal sodium excretion, which results in a decreased ECF and blood volume. Secondary effects may be an improvement in cardiac ejection fraction and reduction of systemic blood pressure.

Renal 
ANP acts on the kidney to increase sodium and water excretion (natriuresis) in the following ways:
 The medullary collecting duct is the main site of ANP regulation of sodium excretion. ANP effects sodium channels at both the apical and basolateral sides.  ANP inhibits ENaC on the apical side and the Sodium Potassium ATPase pump on the basolateral side in a cGMP PKG dependent manner resulting in less sodium re-absorption and more sodium excretion.
 ANP increases glomerular filtration rate and glomerular permeability.  ANP directly dilates the afferent arteriole and counteracts the norepinephrine induced vasoconstriction of the afferent arteriole.  Some studies suggest that ANP also constricts the efferent arteriole, but this is not a unanimous finding.  ANP inhibits the effect of Angiotensin II on the mesangial cells, thereby relaxing them.  ANP increases the radius and number of glomerular pores, thereby increasing glomerular permeability and resulting in greater filter load of sodium and water.
 Increases blood flow through the vasa recta, which will wash the solutes (sodium chloride (NaCl), and urea) out of the medullary interstitium. The lower osmolarity of the medullary interstitium leads to less reabsorption of tubular fluid and increased excretion.
 Decreases sodium reabsorption at least in the thick ascending limb (interaction with NKCC2) and cortical collecting duct of the nephron via guanosine 3',5'-cyclic monophosphate (cGMP) dependent phosphorylation of ENaC. 
 It inhibits renin secretion, thereby inhibiting the production of angiotensin and aldosterone. 
 It inhibits the renal sympathetic nervous system.

ANP has the opposite effect of angiotensin II on the kidney: angiotensin II increases renal sodium retention and ANP increases renal sodium loss.

Adrenal 

 Reduces aldosterone secretion by the zona glomerulosa of the adrenal cortex.

Vascular 

Relaxes vascular smooth muscle in arterioles and venules by:
 Membrane Receptor-mediated elevation of vascular smooth muscle cGMP
 Inhibition of the effects of catecholamines

Promotes uterine spiral artery remodeling, which is important for preventing pregnancy-induced hypertension.

Cardiac 

 ANP inhibits cardiac hypertrophy in heart failure as well as fibrosis. Fibrosis is inhibited by preventing fibroblasts from entering heart tissue and replicating, as well as decreasing inflammation. ANP prevents hypertrophy by inhibiting calcium influx that is caused by norepinephrine.
 Re-expression of NPRA rescues the phenotype.

Adipose tissue 

 Increases the release of free fatty acids from adipose tissue. Plasma concentrations of glycerol and nonesterified fatty acids are increased by i.v. infusion of ANP in humans.
 Activates adipocyte plasma membrane type A guanylyl cyclase receptors NPR-A
 Increases intracellular cGMP levels that induce the phosphorylation of a hormone-sensitive lipase and perilipin A via the activation of a cGMP-dependent protein kinase-I (cGK-I)
 Does not modulate cAMP production or PKA activity.

Immune System 
ANP is produced locally by several immune cells. ANP is shown to regulate several functions of innate and adaptive immune system as well as shown to have cytoprotective effects.

 ANP modulates innate immunity by raising defence against extracellular microbes and inhibiting the release of pro-inflammatory markers and expression of adhesion molecules.
 There is evidence of cytoprotective effects of ANP in myocardial, vascular smooth, endothelial, hepatocytes and tumour cells.

Degradation 

Modulation of the effects of ANP is achieved through gradual degradation of the peptide by the enzyme neutral endopeptidase (NEP). Recently, NEP inhibitors have been developed, such as Sacubitril and Sacubitril/valsartan. They may be clinically useful in treating patients in heart failure with reduced ejection fraction .

Biomarker 

Fragments derived from the ANP precursor, including the signal peptide, N-terminal pro-ANP and ANP, have been detected in human blood. ANP and related peptides are used as biomarkers for cardiovascular diseases such as stroke, coronary artery disease, myocardial infarction and heart failure. A specific ANP precursor called mid-regional pro-atrial natriuretic peptide (MRproANP) is a highly sensitive biomarker in heart failure. MRproANP levels below 120 pmol/L can be used to effectively rule out acute heart failure.

Large amounts of ANP secretion has been noted to cause electrolyte disturbances (hyponatremia) and polyuria. These indications can be a marker of a large atrial myxoma.

Therapeutic use and drug development 

Opinions regarding the use of ANP for the treatment of acute heart failure and kidney disease are varied. While this molecule has been shown to successfully restore some hemodynamic parameters following heart failure, and yield clinical improvement for kidney injury, whether it ultimately reduces mortality and its long-term effects are unknown. Therefore, more studies need to be conducted to better understand the therapeutic effects of ANP. Newly synthesized homologues of ANP molecule are being assessed for the treatment of acute heart failure. Preliminary research on one of such molecules, ularitide, has shown that this drug is safe, well tolerated, and effective in the treatment of acute heart failure.

Other natriuretic peptides 

Brain natriuretic peptide (BNP) – a misnomer; it is secreted by ventricular myocytes – is similar to ANP in its effect. It acts via atrial natriuretic peptide receptors but with 10-fold lower affinity than ANP. The biological half-life of BNP, however, is twice as long as that of ANP, and that of NT-proBNP is even longer, making these peptides better choices than ANP for diagnostic blood testing.

In addition to the mammalian natriuretic peptides (ANP, BNP, CNP), other natriuretic peptides with similar structure and properties have been isolated elsewhere in the animal kingdom. A salmon natriuretic peptide known as salmon cardiac peptide has been described, and dendroaspis natriuretic peptide (DNP) has been found in the venom of the green mamba, as well as an NP in a species of African snake.

Beside these four, five additional natriuretic peptides have been identified: long-acting natriuretic peptide (LANP), vessel dilator, kaliuretic peptide, urodilatin, and adrenomedullin.

Pharmacological modulation 

Neutral endopeptidase (NEP) also known as neprilysin is the enzyme that metabolizes natriuretic peptides. Several inhibitors of NEP are currently being developed to treat disorders ranging from hypertension to heart failure. Most of them are dual inhibitors (NEP and ACE). In 2014, PARADIGM-HF study was published in NEJM. This study considered as a landmark study in treatment of heart failure. The study was double blinded; compared LCZ696 versus enalapril in patients with heart failure. The study showed lower all cause mortality, cardiovascular mortality and hospitalization in LCZ696 arm.
Omapatrilat (dual inhibitor of NEP and angiotensin-converting enzyme) developed by BMS did not receive FDA approval due to angioedema safety concerns. Other dual inhibitors of NEP with ACE/angiotensin receptor are (in 2003) being developed by pharmaceutical companies.

Synonyms 
ANP is also called atrial natriuretic factor (ANF), atrial natriuretic hormone (ANH), cardionatrine, cardiodilatin (CDD), and atriopeptin.

Notes

References

External links 
 
 
 

Peptide hormones
Hormones of the heart